Louis J. Schaefer (December 27, 1907 - August 8, 1988) was an American jockey and trainer in Thoroughbred horse racing best known for winning the Preakness Stakes, second leg of the U.S. Triple Crown series, both as a jockey and as a trainer.

Schaefer rode Dr. Freedland to victory in the 1929 Preakness Stakes. He continued to ride into 1936 when he was hired by William L. Brann to take over as train for his racing stable in 1937. Louis Schaefer trained Challedon to win the 1939 Preakness and went on to earn American Horse of the Year honors for that year.

A resident of Uniondale, New York, in his latter years Louis Schaefer owned a bar and grill across the street from the old Jamaica Race Course. On August 8, 1988, he died of a heart attack at age 80 in a Hempstead, New York hospital.

References

	

1907 births
1988 deaths
American horse trainers
People from Hempstead (town), New York